Maple Front Farm, also known as Locust Front Farm and W. K. Clemmer Farm, is a historic home and farm complex located near Middlebrook, Augusta County, Virginia. The house was built about 1900, and is a two-story, three bay, frame I-house.  Also on the property are a contributing washhouse, meat house, wood house, acetylene gas-generating structure, farm bell tower, garage, and granary.

It was listed on the National Register of Historic Places in 2010.

References

Farms on the National Register of Historic Places in Virginia
Houses completed in 1900
Houses in Augusta County, Virginia
National Register of Historic Places in Augusta County, Virginia